Izvoarele (historically Alibeichioi and then Regele Ferdinand; called Filimon Sîrbu from 1948 to 1964, Izvoarele since 1965) is a commune in Tulcea County, Northern Dobruja, Romania. It is composed of three villages: Alba, Iulia and Izvoarele.

At the 2011 census, of the residents for whom data were available, 54.4% were Romanians and 45.3% Greeks.

References

Communes in Tulcea County
Localities in Northern Dobruja